Streel may refer to the following people

José Streel, a Belgian journalist and supporter of Rexism
Marc Streel, a Belgian racing cyclist

Also, Streel may refer to